Jamayel Ramir Smith (born August 9, 1984) is a former American football wide receiver. He was signed by the New York Sentinels as an undrafted free agent in 2009. He played college football at Mississippi State.

College career
Smith was a walk-on at Mississippi State and redshirted as a freshman. He placed third on the team in receptions (20) and had 335 yards. In his third year, he was an integral part of an 8–5 Bulldogs team, placing second in receptions and having three touchdowns on the year.
His total college stats are as follows: 76 receptions, 1,147 yards and 6 touchdowns.

Professional career

New York Sentinels
Smith was signed by the New York Sentinels of the United Football League on September 9, 2009.

References

External links
just Sports Stats
Mississippi State Bulldogs bio
United Football League bio

1984 births
Living people
American football wide receivers
Mississippi State Bulldogs football players
New York Sentinels players
Winnipeg Blue Bombers players
Canadian football wide receivers
Players of Canadian football from Atlanta
Players of American football from Atlanta